Geocoris pallens, the western big-eyed bug, is a species of big-eyed bug in the family Geocoridae. It is found in Central America, North America, and Oceania.

Subspecies
These two subspecies belong to the species Geocoris pallens:
 Geocoris pallens pallens Stal, 1854
 Geocoris pallens solutus Montandon, 1908

References

Lygaeoidea
Articles created by Qbugbot
Insects described in 1854